Jagte Raho is a 1956  Bollywood/Bengali film, directed by Amit Maitra and Sombhu Mitra, written by Khwaja Ahmad Abbas, and produced by and starring Raj Kapoor. The film centers on the trials of a poor villager (Kapoor) who comes to a city in search of a better life. However, the naive man soon becomes trapped in a web of middle-class greed and corruption. The film also features a cameo by Nargis in the final scene.

It was produced in Bengali as Ek Din Raatre, starring Raj Kapoor, Chhabi Biswas, Pahari Sanyal, Nargis Dutt and Daisy Irani. The film won the Crystal Globe Grand Prix at the Karlovy Vary International Film Festival in Czechoslovakia in 1957.

Plot summary

A poor peasant (Kapoor) from the village, who comes to the city in search of work, is looking for some water to quench his thirst. He enters an apartment complex, whose residents take him for a thief and chase him. He runs from one flat to the other trying to escape his predicament. Along the way, he witnesses many shady undertakings in the flats where he hides. Ironically, these crimes are being committed by the so-called "respectable" citizens of the city, who by day, lead a life totally in contrast to their nighttime deeds behind closed doors.

He is shocked by these events and tries to escape by evading the search parties that are patrolling the apartment building in search of the elusive thief. He is unfortunately seen, and people chase him to the roof of the building. He puts up a brave resistance and then descends by the water pipes onto the porch of a flat. He goes in to find a young girl (Daisy Irani). She talks to him and kindles a self-belief in the peasant, who determinedly tries to face the adversity waiting outside. But when he ventures out of the flat, he is surprised to find that nobody takes notice of him. He eventually leaves the apartment building, his thirst still unquenched. He hears a beautiful song and searching for its source arrives at the doorstep of a woman (Nargis) drawing water from a well. His thirst is finally assuaged.

Music
Other than the acting, the music is the highlight of the film. Lyrics are by Shailendra and Prem Dhawan and music is by Salil Choudhary.

The songs are

1. "Zindagi Khawab Hai, Khvaab Me Jhuth Kya Aur Bhala Sach Hai Kya" - Mukesh

2. "Main Koi Jhoot Boleya" - Mohammed Rafi and S. Balbir

3. "Jaago Mohan Pyaare" - Lata Mangeshkar

4. "Thandee Thandee Savan Kee Phuhar" - Asha Bhosle

5. "Maine Jo Li Angdayi" - Haridhan, Sandhya Mukherjee

Bengali version
The song "Zindagi Khwab Hai", picturized on Motilal in Hindi was recorded as "Ei Duniaye Shobi Hoi" (Sung by Manna Dey) in the Bengali version and was picturized on Chhabi Biswas. Most of the story line is identical between the two versions, as were the songs; "Teki Main Jhuth Boliya", sung by Mohammed Rafi and picturized on Sikh drivers is consistent in both versions. "Jago Mohan Pritam", sung by Lata Mangeshkar is common to both versions - only the lyrics were changed to Hindi and Bengali, as applicable.

Cast
 Raj Kapoor as Peasant
 Nargis (cameo)
 Pradeep Kumar as Pradeep
 Sumitra Devi 
 Smriti Biswas 
 Pahari Sanyal 
 Sulochana Chatterjee 
 Daisy Irani 
 Motilal as Singing Drunk (Only in Hindi version) 
 Chhabi Biswas as Singing Drunk (Only in Bengali version) 
 Nana Palsikar as Doctor
 Iftekhar as Chandu (Leader)
 Nemo 
 Manohar Deepak in song "Main Koi Jhoot Boleya"
 Mauji Singh in song "Main Koi Jhoot Boleya"
 Kartar Singh in song "Main Koi Jhoot Boleya"

Reception

Box office
Jagte Raho was an overseas blockbuster at the Soviet box office, drawing 33.6 million Soviet viewers in 1965, due to Raj Kapoor's popularity in the Soviet Union. In the Soviet Union, the film earned an estimated 8.4 million Rbls (US$9.33 million or 4.44 crore) in 1965, equivalent to US$ million (477 crore) in 2016.

Awards
A shortened version of the film won the Crystal Globe Grand Prix at the Karlovy Vary International Film Festival in Czechoslovakia in 1957. At the fourth annual National Film Awards, the film won the Certificate of Merit.

Notes

References

External links
 
 Jagte Raho (1956) on YouTube

1950s Hindi-language films
1956 films
Bengali-language Indian films
Crystal Globe winners
Films scored by Salil Chowdhury
Indian multilingual films
1950s Bengali-language films
Indian black-and-white films